Mo' Horizons is a duo of DJs from Hannover, Germany. Their music can be described as a mixture of downtempo, acid-jazz, nu jazz, soul, funk, dub, trip hop, big beat, bossa nova, boogaloo and drum'n'bass. They first came to prominence on various compilation albums, including the Buddha Bar series. They are known for their extensive use of sampling and modern production techniques in Latin jazz. They are also known for recording a Portuguese version of the classic hit Hit The Road Jack.

Their tracks were remixed by many DJs, including Nicola Conte, Swag, Skeewiff, Bobby Hughes, Only Child and DJ Day.

Mo' Horizons were initially signed by the 'Stereo Deluxe' label. After releasing their fourth studio album, Mo' Horizons decided to create their own label, Agogo Records. Apart from releasing their own albums, the label also looks for new talent from around the world, in order to help them with their first releases.

Discography

Studio albums

 Come Touch The Sun (1999)
 Remember Tomorrow (2001)
 ...And The New Bohemian Freedom (2003)
 Sunshine Today (2007)
 Mo' Horizons and the Banana Soundsystem (2011)

Singles

 Yes Baby Yes (1999)
 Hit The Road Jack (2000)
 Ay Y N' Ama (2007)
 Lovely Day Inside EP (2008)

Compilations

 Some More Horizons (2005)
 Ten Years Of... (2008)

Appearances on compilations

 Buddha Bar, Volume 7
Putamayo Presents:
 Asian Groove
 Cover the World
 hôtel costes, sept

References

External links
 Mo' Horizons official MySpace page
 Mo' Horizons at Discogs.com
 www.agogo-records.com

German funk musical groups
Latin jazz ensembles
German jazz ensembles